Nicole Denise (born 11 May 1949) is a French athlete. She competed in the women's high jump at the 1968 Summer Olympics.

References

1949 births
Living people
Athletes (track and field) at the 1968 Summer Olympics
French female high jumpers
Olympic athletes of France
Place of birth missing (living people)